Kim Jae-gul (born September 7, 1972) is South Korean professional baseball coach for the Samsung Lions of the Korea Baseball Organization. He represented the South Korea national baseball team at the 1994 Asian Games and 2006 World Baseball Classic.

External links 
 Career statistics and player information from Korea Baseball Organization 
 Roster Info: Kim Jae-gul – Samsung Lions Baseball Team

References 

1972 births
2006 World Baseball Classic players
Asian Games medalists in baseball
Baseball players at the 1994 Asian Games
Dankook University alumni
KBO League infielders
Living people
Samsung Lions coaches
Samsung Lions players
South Korean baseball coaches
South Korean baseball players
Baseball players from Seoul
Medalists at the 1994 Asian Games
Asian Games silver medalists for South Korea